Ümit Özdağ (born 3 March 1961) is a Turkish politician and a member of the Grand National Assembly of Turkey. He was deputy leader of the far-right Nationalist Movement Party (MHP) from November 2015 to February 2016. He announced his candidacy for the party leadership for the 8th MHP Ordinary Congress in 2006, but had his membership revoked two days later. After returning to the party following a successful lawsuit, he again announced his candidacy for the MHP leadership in April 2016 for the 2016 Nationalist Movement Party Extraordinary Congress, which was eventually called off after numerous legal disputes. He had his party membership revoked by the MHP High Disciplinary Board on 15 November 2016 joined the Good Party. In April 2019, he resigned from party's executive board but announced that he will continue to be in the party and continue his party-related activities. On 16 November 2020, Özdağ was also dismissed from the Good Party. He founded the far-right anti-immigrant Victory Party on August 26, 2021 and was elected the first chairman.

Early life and education
Ümit Özdağ was born on 3 March 1961 in Tokyo, Japan, where his father Muzaffer Özdağ(Army Officer) served as a Turkish government advisor after the Coup d'etat of 1960. His parents are from the cities of Kayseri and Gaziantep in Turkey. He is of Dagestan (Lak) origin.

His mother, Gönül Özdağ, who is a former lawyer, is the founder and she would go on to serve as the first MHP Women's Wing President. His father was a close ally of MHP founder Alparslan Türkeş and served as a member of the National Unity Committee that was installed following the 1960 Turkish coup d'état.

Özdağ studied philosophy, politics and economics at the Ludwig Maximilian University of Munich, before completing a master's degree on Turkish strategic development and state planning institutions.

Educational and Academic career
Ümit Özdağ completed his primary, secondary and high school education at TED Ankara College. During his high school years, Ümit Özdağ started a political struggle within the idealist movement (Ülkücü Movement) at Çankaya Ülkü Ocakları and Ankara College in Ankara. Due to the nationalist activities during this struggle, he was dismissed from Ankara College with a certificate of approval upon the instruction of the Governor of Ankara at the time, after the classes were completed on the last day of the 1977/78 academic year. Therefore, Ümit Özdağ received his high school diploma from Aktepe High School in Ankara.

Ümit Özdağ completed his higher education at Ludwig Maximilians University in Munich between 1980-1986. He studied political science and philosophy at the Ludwig Maximilians University in Munich. Ümit Özdağ prepared his graduate study on "Planned Development and State Planning Organization in Turkey".

Ümit Özdağ started to work as a research assistant at Gazi University Faculty of Economics and Administrative Sciences in 1986. He became a doctor of political science in 1990 with his study on "Army-Political Relations in the Period of Atatürk and İnönü".

Dr. Özdağ received the title of associate professor of political theory in 1993 with his thesis on "Army-Political Relations in the Menderes Period and the May 27 Military Movement".

Assoc. Dr. Ümit Özdağ started to publish and edited the quarterly international relations and strategic research journal named “Eurasia File”, which was to be published until 2004.

Özdağ, who has been conducting research on terrorism and ethnic problems since the late 1980s, carried out socio-political field research in the provinces that received immigrants from our Eastern, Southeastern and Southeastern Anatolian provinces in 1995. In 1997, he conducted field research in the Mutki district of Bitlis. In 1996, he carried out economic-centered research in Erbil and Sulaymaniyah in Northern Iraq.

Ümit Özdağ conducted research on globalization and ethnic issues in Eurasia at Towson University in Baltimore, USA, between 1997-1998, and gave lectures on the same subjects.

Ümit Özdağ established the Eurasian Strategic Research Center (ASAM), one of the largest strategic research centers in the world and the first of the modern strategic research institutions in Turkey, in 1999. In 2000, he established the Armenian Studies Institute affiliated to ASAM. Ümit Özdağ was the chairman and chairman of the board of directors of ASAM until 2004.

Ümit Özdağ established the strategic research center "Diyanet Research Center" (DIYAM), which examines religious relations and problems from a strategic point of view, for the Presidency of Religious Affairs in 2003 and served as its chairman for six months.

prof. Dr. Ümit Özdağ in 2005, “21. He founded and chaired the think tank named “Twentieth Century Turkey Institute”. After 2015, Özdağ continued his duty as the chairman of the board of directors of the 21st Century Turkey Institute until 2021.

Ümit Özdağ has given lectures and lectures not only at Gazi University, where he is a faculty member, but also at the Military Academy, Police Academy, Police Intelligence Department, National Security Academy, National Security Academy Public Diplomacy Courses, School of Justice and the Ministry of Interior.

Prof. Dr. Özdağ has given conferences at various universities and research centers in Washington, Moscow, Tokyo, New Delhi, Cairo, Alexandria, Brussels, Tehran, Bishkek, Alma Ata, London, Munich and Tel Aviv. He has also participated in congresses in many countries and presented papers.

In addition to his academic and political studies on Turkey's security, Özdağ also fought for democracy not only through discourse but also through action. Ümit Özdağ, who became a professor in 2001, left Gazi University by protesting the anti-democratic rector appointment made by President Ahmet Necdet Sezer at Gazi University in 2005, saying that he would not give lectures at universities as long as Sezer was President. prof. Dr. Ümit Özdağ returned to teaching at Gazi University, Faculty of Economics and Administrative Sciences, after the presidential term of President Ahmet N. Sezer expired.

Working on security sciences, intelligence science, low-intensity conflict, ethnic problems, the European Union, Eurasia and the Middle East, Prof. Dr. Ümit Özdağ has twenty-eight books published. He has published 11 books that he has edited. There are four translation books from German. He has over 300 articles published in magazines and newspapers such as Eurasia File, Strategic Analysis, Türk Yurdu, 21 Yüzyıl. prof. Dr. Ümit Özdağ speaks English,  French and German.

Political career

First MHP leadership bid
In 2006, Özdağ announced his candidacy for the leadership of the Nationalist Movement Party (MHP). His candidacy was rejected and his party membership was revoked two days later, with incumbent leader Devlet Bahçeli being re-elected. Özdağ subsequently returned to Gazi University as a lecturer. He returned to the MHP in 2010 following a successful lawsuit, being fielded as a parliamentary candidate from İstanbul's second electoral district for the 2011 general election. Being in fourth place in his party's candidate list, he was not elected.

Second MHP leadership bid
During the 11th Nationalist Movement Party Ordinary Congress, he was elected as a member of the MHP Central Executive Committee. He was elected as a Member of Parliament for Gaziantep in the June 2015 general election and was re-elected in the November 2015 general election. On 14 November, he became a Deputy Leader of the Party responsible for the Turkish world and international relations.

Özdağ resigned as deputy leader on 24 February 2016, calling for the party to hold an extraordinary congress following its heavy defeat in the November 2015 election. He announced his candidacy for the party leadership on 9 April 2016 after fellow leadership candidates began collecting delegate signatures for an extraordinary congress. The process of holding the 2016 Nationalist Movement Party Extraordinary Congress became embroiled in legal disputes and was eventually disbanded after an intervention from the Supreme Electoral Council of Turkey. On 20 October, Özdağ was again referred to the MHP High Disciplinary Board pending dismissal from the party, which took effect on 15 November 2016.

Özdağ claimed that his dismissal also originated from his opposition to an executive presidency, which Devlet Bahçeli supported. The MHP announced that they would jointly draft a new constitution that included an executive presidency with the governing Justice and Development Party (AKP) in October 2016.

Victory Party 
In August 2021, he announced the foundation of the Victory Party, a far-right, anti-immigrant political party whose logo was inspired by Mustafa Kemal Atatürk and the Seljuk leader Alp Arslan. In May 2022 he had an altercation with Interior Minister Süleyman Soylu who amongst statements other deemed him a puppet of George Soros, not a human and lower than an animal during a TV broadcast. In response Özdağ challenged to see Soylu at his ministry, and that if he was "man enough" should not hide behind the Turkish police. As Özdağ then showed up at the ministry, he was blocked by the police.  

According to a Bloomberg analysis, the average likes Ümit Özdağ got on Twitter in May 2022 exceeded even Turkey's President Recep Tayyip Erdoğan.

Views 
In an excerpt from Ümit Özdağ's 2006 book entitled “Gelecek 1000 Yılda da Buradayız” (We Are Here for the Next 1000 Years), among other groups, Özdağ described Circassians as “separatists” after an alleged demonstration took place in the city of Istanbul by a group of Circassian activists requesting the governments of the Russian Federation and Republic of Turkey to grant the Circassians living in Turkey dual citizenship.

Personal life 
He is single and has one son named Alp Özdağ. He speaks English, German and French.

Books 

 Değişen Dünya Dengeleri ve Basra Körfezi Krizi, 1990
 Atatürk ve İnönü Dönemlerinde Ordu-Siyaset İlişkisi, 
 Menderes ve İnönü Döneminde Ordu-Siyaset İlişkileri ve 27 Mayıs İhtilali, 1996, 
 Türkiye, Kuzey Irak ve PKK - Bir Gayri Nizami Savaşın Anatomisi, 1999
 Türkiye-Avrupa Birliği İlişkileri, 2003
 Türkiye'de Düşük Yoğunluklu Çatışma ve PKK, 2005
 Yeniden Türk Milliyetçiliği, 2006, 
 Gelecek 1000 Yılda da Buradayız, 2006, 
 Kürtçülük Sorununun Analizi ve Çözüm Politikaları, 2006, 
 Atatürk ve İnönü Dönemlerinde Türk Silahlı Kuvvetleri, 2006, 
 Türk Ordusunun PKK Operasyonları, 2007, 
 Kerkük, Irak ve Ortadoğu, 2007, 
 Türk Ordusunun Kuzey Irak Operasyonları, 2008, 
 Telafer: Bir Türkmen Kentinin Amerikan Ordusu ve Peşmergelere Karşı Savaşı, 2008, 
 İstihbarat Teorisi, 2008, 
 PKK Neden Bitmedi Nasıl Biter - Kürtçülük Sorununun Analizi ve Çözüm Politikaları, 2008
 Pusu ve Katliamların Kronolojisi, 2009, 
 Ermeni Psikolojik Savaşı, (Prof. Dr. Özcan Yeniçeri ile), 2009, 
 Cumhuriyetin En Uzun Dört Yılından Geçerken Türk Sorunu, 2010
 Türk Ordusu PKK’yı Nasıl Yendi, Türkiye PKK’ya Nasıl Teslim Oluyor, 2010, 
 Doğu Raporu, (İkbal Vurucu ve Ali Aydın Akbaş ile birlikte), 2011, 
 İkinci Tek Parti Dönemi - AKP'nin Yumuşak Hegemon Parti Projesinin Anatomisi, 2011
 Küçük Orta Doğu: Suriye, 2012, 
 21. Yüzyılda Prens, 2012, 
 Algı Yönetimi: Propaganda, Psikolojik Savaş, Örtülü Operasyon ve Enformasyon Savaşı, 2014, 
 İstihbarat Örgütleri, 2015, 
 Milli Güvenlik Teorisi, 2015, 
 Türk Dış Politikası, (Yelda Demirağ ile birlikte), 2016, 
 PKK İle Pazarlık: Öcalan İle Anayasa Yapmak, 2016, 
 Türk'ün Vatanla İmtihanı, 2017, 
 100.Yılında Birinci Dünya Savaşı, 2017
 Türk Dış Politikasını Nasıl Bilirdiniz, (Yelda Demirağ ile Birlikte), 2017, 
 İstihbarat Örgütleri, 2017
 Cesetler Gölgeler Yalanlar, 2017, 
 İkinci Tek Parti Dönemi, 2017, 
 Teşkilat-ı Mahsusa'nın 100.Yılında Türk İstihbaratı, 2017
 21. Yüzyılda Türk Dünyası Jeopolitiği, 2017, 
 Türk Sorunu, 2017, 
 Kendi Ülkesinde Kuşatılan ve Bölünen Ordu: Türk Silahlı Kuvvetleri, 2019, 
 Kaçınılmaz Çöküş, 2019, 
 Türk Dış Politikasında Hasar Tespiti, 2019, 
 Stratejik Göç Mühendisliği, 2020, 
 Saray Rejiminin Çöküşü ve Türkiye'nin Yükselişi, 2021,

See also 
 Sinan Oğan
 Koray Aydın

References

External links
 MP profile on the Grand National Assembly website
 Personal website
 Personal Twitter
 Personal Youtube channel

Living people
Nationalist Movement Party politicians
Members of the 25th Parliament of Turkey
Members of the 26th Parliament of Turkey
Members of the 27th Parliament of Turkey
Academic staff of Gazi University
Ludwig Maximilian University of Munich alumni
Deputies of Gaziantep
Gazi University alumni
1961 births
Former Good Party politicians
Turkish political party founders
Politicians from Tokyo
Deniers of the Armenian genocide
Turkish nationalists
Far-right politics in Turkey
Laks (Caucasus)